Joseph Gilles Bilodeau (July 31, 1955August 12, 2008) was a Canadian professional ice hockey player who played nine games in the National Hockey League and 143 games in the World Hockey Association between 1976 and 1980. He played for the Toronto Toros, Birmingham Bulls, and Quebec Nordiques. Bilodeau was nicknamed "Bad News", due to a physically aggressive style of play.

Playing career
Born in Saint-Prime, Quebec, Bilodeau played junior hockey for the Sorel Black Hawks. In 1975, the Toros selected him No. 122 overall in the amateur league draft. He made his pro debut with the minor league Beauce Jaros. In his first pro season, Bilodeau led the NAHL in penalty minutes, accumulating 451 minutes in just 58 games during the 1975–76 season. The eight goals and 17 assists he recorded were the highest season totals of his career.

Finishing off the 1975–76 season with the Toros, he played 14 games in spot duty accumulating 1 assist and 38 penalty minutes. Next year the Toros transferred to Birmingham to become the Bulls. During the 1976–77 season, Bilodeau split his time with the Birmingham Bulls and the Charlotte Checkers of the SHL. With Birmingham he played 34 games while scoring 2 goals and 6 assists and picking up 133 penalty minutes. In Charlotte, he had 3 goals, 6 assists and 242 penalty minutes during 28 games. He would finish the 1977–78 season with 258 penalty minutes with the Bulls.

The Quebec Nordiques signed him as a free agent in 1978. The following season, the Nordiques were among the four WHA teams absorbed into the NHL. Bilodeau skated in nine NHL games, gaining a single assist and recording just 25 penalty minutes. He played the 1980–81 season for the Richmond Rifles of the EHL before settling in Birmingham. He played to 2 games for the Birmingham Bulls of the ACHL during the 1983–84 season before retiring.

He died on Aug. 12, 2008, in Birmingham, Alabama.

Career statistics

Regular season and playoffs

References

External links
 

1955 births
2008 deaths
Beauce Jaros players
Binghamton Dusters players
Birmingham Bulls players
Birmingham Bulls (ACHL) players
Canadian ice hockey left wingers
Charlotte Checkers (SHL) players
Ice hockey people from Quebec
People from Saguenay–Lac-Saint-Jean
Quebec Nordiques (WHA) players
Quebec Nordiques players
Richmond Rifles players
Sorel Éperviers players
Syracuse Firebirds players
Toronto Toros draft picks
Toronto Toros players
Undrafted National Hockey League players